Miechy  is a village in the administrative district of Gmina Miłki, within Giżycko County, Warmian-Masurian Voivodeship, in northern Poland.

Before 1945, the area was part of Germany (East Prussia).

References

Miechy